The Body in the Thames (German: Die Tote aus der Themse) is a 1971 West German thriller film directed by Harald Philipp and starring Uschi Glas, Hansjörg Felmy and Werner Peters. It is part of the series of Edgar Wallace adaptations made by Rialto Film. It was the last shot in Germany, with two Italian films following before the end of the series.

The film's sets were designed by the art director Johannes Ott. It was shot on location in London and Berlin.

Synopsis
After her sister is murdered by a drug gangs, Australian Danny Fergusson arrives in London to find out what happened.

Cast
 Uschi Glas as Danny Fergusson 
 Hansjörg Felmy as Inspector Craig 
 Werner Peters as William Baxter 
 Harry Riebauer  as Milton S. Farnborough 
 Vadim Glowna  as David Armstrong 
 Siegfried Schürenberg  as Sir John 
 Günther Stoll as Doctor Ellis 
 Petra Schürmann  as Susan 
 Friedrich Schoenfelder as Anthony Wyman 
 Lyvia Bauer as Myrna Fergusson 
 Peter Neusser as Sergeant Simpson 
 Friedrich G. Beckhaus as Bordellbesitzer 
 Michael Miller as Jim Donovan 
 Gerd Frickhöffer as Pennymaker 
 Ingrid Steeger as Kitty 
 Brigitte Skay  as Maggy McConnor 
 Ivan Desny as Louis Stout
 Ingrid Bethke as Saleswoman

References

Bibliography 
 Bergfelder, Tim. International Adventures: German Popular Cinema and European Co-Productions in the 1960s. Berghahn Books, 2005.

External links 
 

1971 films
1970s thriller films
German thriller films
West German films
1970s German-language films
Films directed by Harald Philipp
Constantin Film films
Films set in London
Films based on British novels
Films based on works by Edgar Wallace
1970s German films